Jeffrey Solomon Mace, also known as the Patriot and Captain America, is a superhero appearing in American comic books published by Marvel Comics. The character was created during the 1940s, a period fans and historians call the Golden Age of Comic Books. As the Patriot, he first appeared in Human Torch Comics #4 (March 1941; mis-numbered #3 on cover), published by Marvel's 1940s precursor, Timely Comics.

In 1976, Marvel revealed via retroactive continuity that Mace had become the third Captain America some time after his World War II era adventures. He is also the uncle-by-marriage of Thunderbolt Ross.

The character was adapted into the Marvel Cinematic Universe TV series Agents of S.H.I.E.L.D., portrayed by Jason O'Mara.

Publication history
The superhero the Patriot debuted in The Human Torch #4 (March 1941; mis-numbered #3 on cover), with both a two-page text story by writer Ray Gill, with a spot illustration by artist Bill Everett, and a 10-page comics story by writer Gill and artist George Mandel. The character went on to appear in the first of two Human Torch issues both inadvertently numbered #5, and known to collectors as #5[a] (Summer 1941), in a story by Gill and artist Sid Greene. Concurrently, the Patriot began as regular feature in the superhero anthology Marvel Mystery Comics, appearing in issues #21–44 (July 1941 – June 1943) and #49 -74 (Nov. 1943 – July 1946), making him one of Timely's most popular characters in the second tier beneath stars Captain America, the Human Torch, and the Sub-Mariner. The Patriot story "Death Stalks the Shipyard", from Marvel Mystery Comics #29, was reprinted during the Silver Age of Comic Books in Marvel Super-Heroes #16 (Sept. 1968).

In The Avengers #97 (March 1972), a simulacrum of the Patriot was temporarily created from the mind of Rick Jones, along with those of the Blazing Skull, the Fin, and the Golden Age Angel and Vision, to aid the superhero team the Avengers during the Kree-Skrull War.

The Patriot appeared in a four-part flashback story running through The Invaders #5–6 (March & May 1976) and Marvel Premiere #29–30 (April & June 1976), set during World War II which retconned him as a member of a newly created superhero team, the Liberty Legion. That team later appeared alongside Fantastic Four member the Thing in a two-part time travel story, set during World War II, in Marvel Two-in-One #20 (Oct. 1976) and Marvel Two-in-One Annual (1976).

When Marvel Comics had revived the character Captain America in 1964, the story explained that he had been missing in action and in suspended animation since 1945. This discrepancy with his postwar comic-book appearances was later explained as the result of replacement heroes taking on the mantle. As the third Captain America, Jeffrey Mace would have been behind the mask in Captain America Comics #59–75 (Nov. 1946 – Feb. 1950) and other comics during that period. Mace succeeded the second Captain America, William Naslund (formerly the Spirit of '76), who was shown in What If? vol. 1, #4 (Aug. 1977) as having been killed in 1946.

Mace appeared briefly in a flashback in Captain America #215 (Nov. 1977), then as a guest-star in Captain America Annual #6 (1982) with his death depicted in #285 (Sept. 1983). In a flashback, the Patriot co-starred in a World War II adventure with Captain America in Captain America Annual #13 (1994) and in a post-war adventure with the All Winners Squad in All Winners Squad 70th Anniversary Special (2009).

A retelling of Jeffrey Mace's origin and time as Captain America is told in the 2010 mini-series Captain America: Patriot. This was collected with the All Winners Squad 70th Anniversary Special and What If? #4 in 2011. What If? #4 was also collected that same year in a Captain America Legacy volume collecting the debuts of the Captain America replacements.

Fictional character biography
Jeffrey Mace was born in Brooklyn, New York.  He was a reporter at the Daily Bugle, who was inspired to become a superhero after seeing Captain America in action. As the Patriot, Mace becomes one of several superheroes who fight Nazi saboteurs and supervillains during World War II, sometimes alongside his sidekick Mary Morgan, a.k.a. Miss Patriot. He helps found the superhero team known as the Liberty Legion, billed as "America's home front heroes" who fight saboteurs, fifth columnists and other wartime threats within the United States.

After the war, the Patriot continues to fight crime on a regular basis, eventually helping the All-Winners Squad prevent the assassination of a young Senator John Fitzgerald Kennedy in 1946. The skirmish costs the life of the second Captain America, William Naslund formerly the Spirit of '76. Mace is recruited to be the third Captain America, retiring in 1949. He marries Betsy Ross who, as the superhero Golden Girl, had briefly been the post-war sidekick of his Captain America, and eventually succumbs to cancer at an old age.

Powers and abilities
Jeffrey Mace had no superpowers but he was an exceptional athlete, a superb hand-to-hand combatant and a licensed pilot. As Captain America, he carried a shield, similar to that used by his predecessors, that was made of enhanced titanium.

Reception
In American Comic Book Chronicles: 1940-1944, Kurt Mitchell and Roy Thomas call the Patriot "a bargain-basement Captain America with an uncanny knack for stumbling into Axis conspiracies. Though Arthur "Art" Gates and Sidney "Sid" Greene did their best to replicate Jack Kirby's frenetic fight scenes, the feature had none of the charisma of its inspiration."

In other media
 Jeffrey Mace appears in the fourth season of Agents of S.H.I.E.L.D., portrayed by Jason O'Mara. This version is an ex-journalist who survived Helmut Zemo's attack on the United Nations during the events of the film Captain America: Civil War. Debuting in the episode "Meet the New Boss", he is introduced as the new director of S.H.I.E.L.D. Although initially believed to be an Inhuman with super-strength and enhanced durability, Mace is actually empowered by a serum derived from Calvin Zabo's formula as part of "Project Patriot". While most of the negative side effects were removed, it puts significant strain on Mace's physiology. While living in a virtual reality called the "Framework", Mace's personal history is rewritten to "correct" his most potent regret, resulting in his becoming an actual Inhuman who joined, then later took command of, remnant S.H.I.E.L.D. forces and successfully lead them against HYDRA. In the episode, "No Regrets", Mace sacrifices himself inside the Framework to save Phil Coulson's team and Inhumans from a HYDRA attack, which also caused the death of his real world body.
 Jeffrey Mace appears in Agents of S.H.I.E.L.D.: Slingshot, with Jason O'Mara reprising the role. The digital series acts as a prologue to the aforementioned fourth season of Agents of S.H.I.E.L.D..

References

External links
Jeffrey Mace at Marvel Wiki
Independent Heroes from the U.S.A.: Patriot 
The Unofficial Handbook of Marvel Comics Creators

Captain America characters
Characters created by Bill Everett
Comics characters introduced in 1941
Fictional American Jews
Fictional aviators
Fictional characters from New York City
Fictional shield fighters
Fictional World War II veterans
Golden Age superheroes
Incarnations of Captain America
Marvel Comics male superheroes
Marvel Comics superheroes
Marvel Comics television characters
Timely Comics characters
United States-themed superheroes